The 22nd government of Turkey (9 December 1955 – 25 November 1957) was a government in the history of Turkey. It is also called the fourth Menderes government.

Background 
Adnan Menderes, the prime minister of the previous government resigned because of a political crisis about press freedom, called the "right to prove". However, his party, the Democrat Party (DP), had the majority in the parliament, and therefore he founded the next cabinet.

The government
In the list below, the cabinet members who served only a part of the cabinet's lifespan are shown in the column "Notes".

Aftermath
The government ended because of the general elections held on 27 October 1957, in which DP won the majority once again, albeit with reduced support.

References

Cabinets of Turkey
Democrat Party (Turkey, 1946–1961) politicians
1955 establishments in Turkey
1957 disestablishments in Turkey
Cabinets established in 1955
Cabinets disestablished in 1957
Members of the 22nd government of Turkey
10th parliament of Turkey
Democrat Party (Turkey, 1946–1961)